Jake Parnell is an American professional wrestler better known by the ring name Warhorse. He is the former IWTV Champion and has performed in various independent wrestling promotions across the United States and internationally. He is well-known in the industry for a gruesome in-ring injury which occurred when Gary Jay ripped a turnbuckle out of his mouth, tearing his cheek open.

Professional wrestling career
He made his professional wrestling debut as Jake Parnell in March 2013. One of his first matches was in Illinois with Dynamo Pro Wrestling against Alexandre Rudolph on March 5, 2013. That same month Parnell participated in a Triple Threat match against Dave Vaughn and Brandon Gallagher.

Parnell was originally a member of the Viking War Party, a group of Viking wrestlers composed of Alexandre Rudolph and Frank Wyatt. The team was active from Parnell's debut in 2013 to 2016 where Parnell was known as The Little Viking.

In 2019, Parnell, inspired by his love of heavy metal music and 1980s wrestling icons like The Road Warriors and Sting, reinvented himself as Warhorse, a very metal misfit with face paint that likes to headbang, yell, and "Rule Ass".

On September 21, 2019 Warhorse was crowned the IWTV (Independent Wrestling.tv) Champion after defeating Erick Stevens. Warhorse lost the title to Lee Moriarty on March 6, 2021.

Warhorse has been active in Game Changer Wrestling as part of the tag team "Warhausen" with fellow wrestler Danhausen. On July 29, 2020, Warhorse made his debut for All Elite Wrestling (AEW) on Dynamite where he challenged Cody Rhodes for the TNT Championship in a losing effort.

Championships and accomplishments
Black Label Pro
BLP Midwest Championship (1 time)
Fully Loaded Wrestling
FLW Tag Team Championship (1 time) - with Alexandre Rudolph
IndependentWrestling.TV
Independent Wrestling Championship (1 time)
 Pro Wrestling Illustrated
 Indie Wrestler of the Year (2020)
 Ranked No. 97 of the top 500 singles wrestlers in the PWI 500 in 2021
Pro Wrestling ZERO1 USA
ZERO1 USA Heavyweight Championship (1 time)
ZERO1 USA World Junior Heavyweight Championship (2 time)
ZERO1 USA World Tag Team Championship (1 time) - with Alexandre Rudolph

References

External links
 

American male professional wrestlers
Living people
Professional wrestlers from Missouri
Year of birth missing (living people)
Sportspeople from St. Louis